The Lizzie Bennet Diaries is an American web series in the style of video blogging created by Hank Green and Bernie Su, based on the novel Pride and Prejudice by Jane Austen. The series premiered on YouTube on April 9, 2012 and concluded with its 100th episode on March 28, 2013. It starred Ashley Clements, Mary Kate Wiles, Laura Spencer, Julia Cho and Daniel Vincent Gordh.

Over the series' run other characters aside from Lizzie made their own vlogs, complementing the plot. Lydia tells her side of events at her own channel, The Lydia Bennet, Maria Lu shares her experiences at work with her older sister Charlotte at Maria of the Lu, Mr. Collins posts instructional videos from his company at Collins and Collins, and Gigi Darcy says her piece at Pemberley Digital.

Episode list

My name is Lizzie Bennet

Vidcon

Netherfield

Back home

Collins and Collins

Back home again

Pemberley Digital

Consequences

Bonus Episode list 

In anticipation of the release of the series' novel in June 24, 2014, The Secret Diary of Lizzie Bennet by Bernie Su and Kate Rorick, two bonus episodes were posted in 2014, over a year after the series' end.

References

External links 
 
 

Lists of American comedy television series episodes